Concrete and Gold Tour was the ninth concert tour by American rock band Foo Fighters, in support of Concrete and Gold, their ninth studio album. It began June 16, 2017, in Reykjavík, Iceland, and it concluded October 23, 2018 in Calgary, Canada. It marked the first time since November 2015 that the band had toured. The tour also featured summer festivals in Europe and Asia.

Songs Performed

Foo Fighters
"Big Me"
"For All the Cows"
"I'll Stick Around"
"This Is a Call"
"Weenie Beenie"
"Wattershed"
"Alone+Easy Target"

The Colour and the Shape
"Enough Space"
"Everlong"
"Monkey Wrench"
"My Hero"
"Hey, Johnny Park!"
"New Way Home"

There Is Nothing Left to Lose
"Aurora"
"Breakout"
"Generator"
"Learn to Fly"
"Gimme Stitches"

One by One
"All My Life"
"Times Like These"
"Low"

In Your Honor
"Best of You"
"Cold Day in the Sun"

Echoes, Silence, Patience & Grace
"Ballad of the Beaconsfield Miners" 
"Let It Die"
"The Pretender"

Greatest Hits
"Wheels"

Wasting Light
"Arlandria"
"Dear Rosemary"
"Rope"
"These Days"
"Walk"
"White Limo"

Sonic Highways
"Congregation"
"Something from Nothing"

Saint Cecilia (EP)
"Sean"

Concrete and Gold
"Arrows"
"Concrete and Gold"
"Dirty Water"
"La Dee Da"
"Make It Right"
"Run"
"Sunday Rain"
"The Line"
"The Sky Is a Neighborhood"

Other (non-album songs)
"Skin and Bones"

Covers
"Blackbird" 
"Breakdown" 
"Detroit Rock City" 
"Let There Be Rock" 
"Miss You" 
"Mountain Song" 
"Never Gonna Give You Up" 
"Requiem" 
"Stay with Me 
"Sun God" 
"Tom Sawyer" 
"Under My Wheels" 
"Under Pressure"  
"We Will Rock You"  
"Young Man Blues" 
"You Really Got Me" 

Non-complete Covers
"Another One Bites the Dust"  
"Billie Jean" 
"Blitzkrieg Bop" 
"Cat Scratch Fever" 
"Dragon Attack" 
"Eruption" 
"Fat Bottomed Girls" 
"Fly Like An Eagle" 
"Footloose" 
"For Those About to Rock (We Salute You)"  
"Gimme Some Truth" 
"God Save the Queen" 
"Imagine" 
"I'm the One" 
"Jump" 
"Love of My Life"  
"My Sharona" 
"Outshined"  
"Panama" 
"Paradise City" 
"Paranoid" 
"Rio" 
"Rocker"  
"Run to the Hills" 
"Sexy MF" 
"Stairway to Heaven" 
"Tie Your Mother Down" 
"You're the One That I Want" 
"YYZ"

Setlist
This set list is representative of the show on October 20, 2017. It does not represent all concerts for the duration of the tour.

"Run"
"All My Life" 
"Learn to Fly"
"The Pretender"
"The Sky Is a Neighborhood" 
"Walk"
"Rope"
"Sunday Rain"
"My Hero"
"These Days"
"Let it Die"
"I'll Stick Around"
"White Limo"
"Arlandria"
"Times Like These"
"Breakout"
"Make it Right"
"Skin and Bones"
"Fly Like an Eagle" (Steve Miller Band cover)
"Another One Bites the Dust" (Queen cover)
"Blitzkrieg Bop" (Ramones cover)
"Monkey Wrench"
"Best of You"
Encore
"Dirty Water"
"This Is a Call"
"Breakdown" (Tom Petty and the Heartbreakers cover)
"Everlong"

Shows

Notes

References

2017 concert tours
2018 concert tours
Foo Fighters concert tours